My Little Pony Tales is an American animated television series produced by Sunbow Productions and Graz Entertainment with animation being produced by AKOM. The series, based on the My Little Pony toys by Hasbro, weekly aired for 26 episodes from August 2 to December 25, 1992 on The Disney Channel.

The series was noted for its contrast to the previous series, and was also syndicated from 1993 to 1995. , My Little Pony Tales has been released on DVD in Australia, Europe, and the United States.

Plot 
The series followed seven young female ponies who live in Ponyland, a society of anthropomorphic ponies. They are: Starlight, Sweetheart, Melody, Bright Eyes, Patch, Clover, and Bon Bon. They live like humans as they attend school, frequent the local ice cream shop, enter talent contests, and even roller skate. Some of the girl ponies begin to show a romantic interest in the male ponies, Teddy, Ace, and Lancer; they even go on dates with them.

Trivia 
In contrast to the previous series which focused on ponies and humans, the new series centered only on ponies. Each episode featured at least one song, which was performed by the ponies.

Characters 

Like the toys the show was based on, each of the ponies has a distinct flank symbol.

Main 
The seven preteen female ponies are sometimes referred to as the 7 Pony Friends.

 
 
 Starlight, a pink pony with golden-yellow hair, is the sensible and responsible leader of the group. She regards school teacher Miss Hackney highly and aspires to become a teacher herself. Her mother owns the Rainbow Beauty Salon and an ice cream shop where Starlight works. Starlight has a one-sided crush on Ace. Her flank symbol is a yellow star that is surrounded by four blue stars.

 
 
 Sweetheart, a white pony with dark pink hair, dislikes letting anyone down, however, she occasionally finds herself in the middle of fights between her friends. She tends to see the good in ponies, including ones that seem bad like Teddy, whom she likes. Her friends don't like Teddy and this causes friction between them. She is the oldest of four ponies; two of her siblings are named Sugar and Peaches. She wants to be a doctor when she grows up. Her flank symbol is a big red heart that is surrounded by three little orange hearts.

 
 
 Melody, a dark pink pony with sea-blue hair, is the lead singer in the band The Rockin' Beats. She has a somewhat shallow personality and likes to gossip. She occasionally acts spoiled and puts her own interests ahead of those of her friends. She sometimes offers beauty advice to the others, and aspires to become a famous rock star. Her mother is a nurse who works at a hospital. She has younger twin sisters named Jing-A-Ling and Ting-A-Ling. Her flank symbol is a yellow microphone that is surrounded by several music notes.

 
 
 Bright Eyes, a bluish pony with orange red hair, loves to learn things. She tends to think things out logically whenever there is a problem. She wants to be an environmentalist when she grows up. She is infatuated with Lancer. Her father works for the newspaper. Her flank symbol is a notebook and pen.

 
 
 Patch, a peach pony with dark pink hair, who is a member of the soccer team. She acts like an adventurous tomboy and is constantly looking for something to do. She enjoys practical jokes. She wants to join the circus when she grows up. She is the only character in the series to witness magical or supernatural phenomena. Her flank symbol is a patch of pink cloth.

 
 
 Clover, a lavender purple pony with rose-pink hair, tends to be accident prone. She frequently bursts into tears because of her ineptitude, but things generally work out for her in the end because of either luck or because her friends help out. She is very superstitious and gullible. She wants to become a ballerina like her big sister Meadowlark when she grows up. Her flank symbol is a clover leaf.

 
 
 Bon Bon, a yellow pony with burgundy purple hair, enjoys food and cooking. She hates getting dirty. She wants to become a fashion model when she grows up. She keeps a diary. She comes from a large family, with an older sister named Misty and four younger siblings named Amber, Twink, Rusty, and an unnamed baby brother. Her flank symbol is a piece of blue candy.

Supporting 
 
 
 Teddy is a blue male pony with an orange mohawk who wears sunglasses. He is an impulsive show off who tends to irritate others. Despite his bold personality, it is later revealed that he sleeps with a teddy bear, which he keeps hidden from nearly everyone. He becomes a love interest for Sweetheart. His flank symbol is a comb.

 
 
 Ace, a gold male pony with light blond hair, is an athletic and confident jock at the school. Many of the female ponies admire him and consider him a dream date. He is Teddy's best friend, and teams up with him in influencing Lancer. He enjoys soccer and many other activities. He has a crush on Melody, but this is largely unrequited, while Starlight has a crush on him. Bright Eyes thinks "Ace likes Ace better than anyone". His flank symbol is a soccer ball.

 
 
 Lancer, a dark blue male pony with crimson red hair, is quiet and gentle. He is shy and fond of books. His parents are wealthy and are sometimes away on trips. He has feelings for Bright Eyes, and often sides with the girl ponies in order to impress her. He is talented at roller skating. He wants to be an explorer when he grows up. His flank symbol is a Fleur-de-lis.

 
 
 Miss Hackney is a periwinkle pony with lavender hair. She teaches the girl and boy ponies at the school. She shows a high degree of patience, especially with Patch, who has behavior issues. She is strict, but fair. Starlight considers her a role model. It is hinted that she may have feelings for Mr. Kiddoo, who pilots a hot air balloon. Her flank symbol is a small chalkboard.

 Others

Production

Broadcast 
My Little Pony Tales began airing on The Disney Channel on Sunday mornings starting on August 2, 1992, and on weekday mornings starting on September 1, 1992. Reruns of the show continued on The Disney Channel until 1996.

In the half-hour block, the first part featured an episode from the old 1980s series My Little Pony 'n Friends and the second part was an episode made for the new My Little Pony Tales series. The production codes when My Little Pony Tales and its songs were submitted to the US Copyright Office in 1993, were numbered from 200-01 to 200-13.

Broadcast UK history
Sky One (1993–1995)

Voices 
 Brigitta Dau - Patch (episodes 17-26)
 Laura Harris - Bright Eyes
 Willow Johnson - Starlight
 Lalainia Lindbjerg - Clover
 Shane Meier - Lancer
 Maggie Blue O'Hara - Sweetheart
 Kate Robbins - Miss Hackney
 Tony Sampson - Teddy
 Kelly Sheridan - Melody
 Brad Swaile - Ace
 Venus Terzo - Patch (episodes 1-16)
 Chiara Zanni - Bon Bon

Crew 
 Wally Burr – Voice Director, Songs Producer
 Doug Parker – Casting Advisor
 Cathy Weseluck – Singers' Director

Episodes

Merchandise 
In 1992, Hasbro released toys of the 7 Pony Friends to the European market to complement its first generation My Little Pony toy line. They did not produce models for the three male ponies or the teacher from the series, Miss Hackney. Although My Little Pony originated in the United States, the toys were not marketed there. The family ponies, the Barringtons (known as the Berrytowns in toy form), the Sunbrights, and the Meadowsweets were also made into toys, but were only marketed in select European countries.
Several pieces of merchandise were marketed in Europe with the Seven Characters on them, such as comic books, an alarm clock, a backpack, an umbrella and a money box.

Media

Australia
In 2005, MRA Entertainment released the complete series in the country on four DVD sets.

United Kingdom
In the United Kingdom, a single DVD containing ten episodes from the series was released by Metrodome Distribution in August 2004.

Metrodome's "Girls World" and "Girls World 2" DVDs (released in February 2004 and May 2005, respectively) contain two episodes each from the series, however these episodes were not released as part of the standalone DVD.

United States
Shout Factory licensed the series for the United States (Region 1) area. It was released as My Little Pony Tales – The Complete TV Series on DVD on April 28, 2015. The two-disc set contains all 26 episodes of the series.

Notes

References

External links 
 
 

My Little Pony television series
1992 American television series debuts
1992 American television series endings
1990s American animated television series
American children's animated fantasy television series
American children's animated musical television series
Disney Channel original programming
First-run syndicated television programs in the United States
Animated television series about children
Animated television series about horses
Television series by Sunbow Entertainment
Television series set in fictional countries
Television series by Claster Television